Edward Augustus Weeks Jr. (February 19, 1898 – March 11, 1989) was an American writer, essayist, and editor of The Atlantic. He died in 1989 at the age of 91.

Weeks was born in Elizabeth, New Jersey. He attended Cornell and Harvard universities before he earned an LL.D. degree from Cambridge. He sold books for Boni & Liberight before he went to work at The Atlantic. Four years later, he became editor of the Atlantic Monthly Press, and in 1938 he was named editor of The Atlantic.

Weeks' higher education was interrupted when he volunteered for service during World War I. He won the Croix de Guerre for his work driving an ambulance for the American Field Service.

Weeks wrote for, and was the host of, Meet Mr. Weeks, a literary talk radio program on the Blue Network from November 7, 1939, until March 11, 1941. Each episode of the 30-minute program included Weeks' interview of a guest from the press, higher education, publishing, or theater.

Weeks had two brothers. His first wife was Frederica Watriss, who died in 1970. He married Phoebe-Lou Adams in 1971, and they remained wed until his death. They had a son and a daughter. On March 11, 1989, Weeks died in his sleep at his home in Thompson, Connecticut.

References

1898 births
1989 deaths
The Atlantic (magazine) people
American essayists